The name Henderson-Sellers can refer to:

 Ann Henderson-Sellers (born 1952), Professor and former Director of the World Climate Research Programme
 Brian Henderson-Sellers (born 1950), Professor of Information Systems

See also 
 Sellers (disambiguation)
 Sellers (surname)